WLJK (89.1 FM) is a National Public Radio station licensed to Aiken, South Carolina, United States. The station is owned by the South Carolina Educational Television Commission, and is an affiliate of the South Carolina Public Radio News network. The station also serves listeners across the Savannah River in Augusta, Georgia, United States.

External links
South Carolina Public Radio

LJK
NPR member stations
Radio stations established in 1970
1970 establishments in South Carolina